WalkMe is an American multinational software-as-a-service (SaaS) company, with headquarters in San Francisco, California. Its Digital Adoption Platform (DAP) was recognized in Everest Group's PEAK Matrix Assessment of DAP vendors as the leading DAP product. Alongside its headquarters in San Francisco, the company has offices in Raleigh, North Carolina; Tel Aviv, Israel, and a global footprint including the United Kingdom, Australia, and Japan.

WalkMe has more than 2,000 corporate customers and has been recognized on the Forbes Cloud 100 for five consecutive years. As of December 2019, WalkMe has raised more than 307 million in venture capital funding and is valued at 2 billion, making it a unicorn company.

The company's initial public offering (IPO) took place on June 16, 2021, and resulted in a valuation of 2.56 billion.

History
WalkMe Inc. was founded in 2011 by Dan Adika, Rafael Sweary, Eyal Cohen and Yuval Shalom Ozanna. In April 2012, they launched the product WalkMe. In 2017, WalkMe acquired mobile A/B testing and app engagement platform Abbi, and analytics startup Jaco. User interface artificial intelligence company DeepUI.ai was acquired in June 2018, and information enablement tool Zest was acquired in 2021.

Product
WalkMe's Digital Adoption Platform (DAP) is a code-free system which provides product managers and application owners with software and feature adoption tools, as well as change management solutions for web, desktop, and mobile applications. The platform is divided into content creation and design sections for building, managing, and publishing content on top of mobile, web, and desktop applications, as well as data and analytics components to assess user experiences and adoption of software. The solutions offered in the product culminate in 4 major categories:

Guidance
Within applications and websites, the WalkMe builder can create guided walkthroughs which contextually appear to the user as they navigate throughout a given platform.

Engagement
The engagement tools include various methods of notifying users within websites and applications about the steps they need to take or have missed.

Insights
WalkMe Insights provides business executives visibility across their applications and shows where processes need to be changed to improve user efficiency
Management Dashboards: Provide visibility for business executives into system usage and user productivity across the tech portfolio
Digital Experience Analytics (DXA): Provides visibility into user experiences across applications to pinpoint where users struggle and continuously optimize experiences
Tracked events & funnels: Tracks any meaningful event on a website or business application and use funnels to analyze specific behaviors
Session Stream & Session Playback: Recreates user journeys by viewing past user sessions in video or list, to analyze user journeys and points of unintended friction

Automation
WalkMe's platform provides system owners with no-code tools by which they can build automated processes, as well as an ActionBot.

Corporate affairs
In April 2020, WalkMe and Microsoft announced a partnership in which WalkMe's DAP is embedded in Microsoft Dynamics 365 for customers and partners.

In May 2020, Andrew Casey was appointed as the company's first Chief Financial Officer (CFO). Casey, who was previously with ServiceNow, joined WalkMe with 29 years of experience in corporate and operational finance for both private and publicly-traded companies.

In October 2020, WalkMe launched its Digital Adoption Institute to the public, including a scholarship to those unemployed and on furlough by upskilling them in digital adoption.

Funding
WalkMe has raised 307.5 million in nine rounds of funding. The company was valued at 2 billion after its Series G round in December 2019.

In April 2012, WalkMe raised 1 million in its Series A round, led by Mangrove Capital Partners.
In October 2012, it raised its Series B funding of 5.5 million, led by Gemini Israel Ventures.
 In April 2014, WalkMe raised 11 million in its Series C funding round led by Scale Venture Partners.
In June 2015, WalkMe raised Series D of 25 million, led by Greenspring Associates.
 In May 2016 and July 2017, WalkMe raised a total of 125 million in its Series E round led by Insight Partners.
 In September and November 2018, WalkMe raised Series F funding of 50 million from Insight Partners and EDBI.
 In December 2019, WalkMe raised 90 million in its Series G round of funding led by Vitruvian Partners.

References

External links 
 

Software companies of the United States
Companies based in San Francisco
Software companies based in the San Francisco Bay Area
2021 initial public offerings
Companies listed on the Nasdaq
Software companies established in 2012
Development software companies